Darmstadt is a census-designated place in St. Clair County, Illinois, United States.  Its population was 68 as of the 2010 census.

Demographics

History
Darmstadt was laid out in 1855. The community was named after Darmstadt, in Germany. A post office called Darmstadt was established in 1864, and remained in operation until it was discontinued in 1907.

References

Census-designated places in St. Clair County, Illinois
Census-designated places in Illinois